Dubravko "Dubi" Tešević (born December 18, 1981 in Foča, SR Bosnia and Herzegovina) is a Bosnian professional football player.

He has played the large part of his career in the Austrian leagues.

References

External links

Dubravko Tešević at ZeroZero

1981 births
Living people
People from Foča
Association football midfielders
Bosnia and Herzegovina footballers
DSV Leoben players
First Vienna FC players
Livingston F.C. players
SV Ried players
SC-ESV Parndorf 1919 players
C.F. União players
SC Ostbahn XI players
FC Gratkorn players
Scottish Premier League players
Austrian Football Bundesliga players
Segunda Divisão players
Austrian Regionalliga players
Austrian Landesliga players
2. Liga (Austria) players
Bosnia and Herzegovina expatriate footballers
Expatriate footballers in Austria
Bosnia and Herzegovina expatriate sportspeople in Austria
Expatriate footballers in Scotland
Bosnia and Herzegovina expatriate sportspeople in Scotland
Expatriate footballers in Portugal
Bosnia and Herzegovina expatriate sportspeople in Portugal